This is a list of schools in Haidian District, Beijing.

Secondary schools
Note: In China the word 中学 zhōngxué, literally translated as "middle school", refers to any secondary school and differs from the American usage of the term "middle school" to mean specifically a lower secondary school or junior high school. 初中 chū​zhōng is used to refer to a lower secondary school.

 Beihang University Experimental School (北京航空航天大学实验学校) - Main School and Branch School (北航实验学校分校)
 Beijing Bayi School - Secondary School Division (中学部)
 Beijing Bayi School Affiliated Yuquan High School (北京市八一学校附属玉泉中学)
 High School Affiliated to Beijing Institute of Technology - Main Campus, and South Campus (南校区)
 Beijing National Day School - Main School, Branch School 1 (一分校), and Longyue Experimental School (北京市十一学校龙樾实验中学)
 Beijing National Day Experimental School (北京十一实验中学)
 Beijing Normal University  (北京师范大学第三附属中学)
 Beijing City No. 19 High School (北京市第十九中学) - East Campus (东校区) and Yangchun Guanghua Campus (阳春光华校区)
 Beijing No. 20 High School - Main School, and New Capital Campus (新都分校)
 Beijing City No. 20 High School Affiliated Experimental School (北京市第二十中学附属实验学校)
 Beijing City No. 47 High School (北京市第四十七中学)
 
 Beijing 101 Middle School - Main School, Junior High School Division (初中部), and Wenquan Campus (温泉校区)
  (北京一零一中石油分校) - Formerly China University of Petroleum Affiliated High School (北京石油学院附属中学)
 Beijing City Haidian Experimental High School (北京市海淀实验中学) - East Campus (东校区) and West Campus (西校区)
  Affiliated High School (北京市海淀区教师进修学校附属实验学校) - North Campus (北校区) and South Campus (南校区)
 Beijing City Information Management School (北京市信息管理学校} - Zhongguancun Campus (中关村校区)
 Beijing City Jianxiang School (北京市健翔学校) - Main Campus and Renmin University of China Campus (人大校区)
 Beijing City Qinghe High School (北京市清河中学)
 Beijing City Shangdi Experimental School (北京市上地实验学校)
 Beijing City Shangzhuang High School (北京市上庄中学)
 Beijing City Shangzhuang No. 2 High School (北京市上庄第二中学)
 Beijing City Yuhong School (北京市育鸿学校)
 Beijing City Yuying School (北京市育英学校)
 Beijing City Yuyuantan High School (北京市玉渊潭中学)
  - Main Campus, Qinghua Yuan Campus (清华园校区), Shuang Yushu Campus (双榆树校区), and Zhichun Branch School (知春分校)
 Beijing City Haidian District North Part New District Experimental School (北京市海淀北部新区实验学校)
 Beijing Experimental School (Haidian) (北京实验学校（海淀）)
 Beijing Foreign Studies University 
  - East Campus (东校区), North Campus (北校区), and South Campus (南校区) - Also has the Branch School (分校) and No. 2 Branch School (第二分校)
 Beijing Zhongfa Experimental School (北京中法实验学校) Beijing City Wenquan No. 2 High School (北京市温泉第二中学)
 China Agricultural University Affiliated High School (中国农业大学附属中学)
 Capital Normal University Affiliated High School (首都师范大学附属中学) - Main School, and No. 1 Branch School (第一分校)
 Capital Normal University Affiliated High School No. 2 (首都师范大学第二附属中学) - Huayuancun Campus (花园村校区) and Shuguang Campus (曙光校区)
 Capital Normal University Affiliated Yuquan School (首都师范大学附属玉泉学校 )
 Capital Normal University Affiliated Yuxin School (首都师范大学附属育新学校)
  Affiliated High School (中国地质大学附属中学) - See also China University of Geosciences (Beijing)
 China University of Mining and Technology,  Affiliated High School (中国矿业大学（北京）附属中学)
 High School Affiliated to Minzu University of China
 High School Affiliated to Renmin University of China - Main Campus, No. 2 Branch School (第二分校), Cuiwei School (翠微学校) Junior High School Campus (初中校区), Cuiwei School Senior High School Campus (高中校区), and Xishan School (西山学校)
 Affiliated High School of Peking University
 Peking University Health Science Center Affiliated High School (北京医学院附属中学) - Main School and Xiangshan School (香山学校)
 Tsinghua University High School - Main School, Shangdi School (上地学校), and Yongfeng School (永丰学校)
 University of Science and Technology Beijing Affiliated High School (北京科技大学附属中学)

Primary schools

 Beijing Bayi School Primary School Division (北京市八一学校（小学部）)
 Beijing No. 11 School Branch School (北京市十一学校一分校)
 Beijing Experimental School (Haidian) (北京实验学校（海淀）) - Primary School Division (小学部)
 High School Affiliated to Beijing Institute of Technology  - Primary School Division (小学部)
 Beihang University Experimental School Primary Division (北京航空航天大学实验学校小学部)
 Beijing Yuhong School (Primary School Division) (北京市育鸿学校（小学部）)
 Beijing Yuying School (Primary School Division) (北京市育英学校（小学部）)
 Capital Normal University Affiliated Yuquan School (Primary School Division) (首都师范大学附属玉泉学校（小学部）)
 Tsinghua University High School Yongfeng School (Primary School Division) (清华大学附属中学永丰学校（小学部）)

International and private schools
 Beijing Haidian Foreign Language Shi Yan School (elementary through senior high school)
Beijing Haidian International School
 Pennon Foreign Language School, Beijing
 Saint Paul American School

References

 
Haidian